"Truly" is the second single from Delerium's album Chimera featuring singer Nerina Pallot.

Just like the rest of the album, this song has a much more pop feel than Delerium's previous work.

Also this single was released with a remix as a radio version. This time with a remix by Wise Buddah. Other remixes were made by Infusion, Brother Brown and Signum.

There was no video made for the single.

Track listing
 US CD Single - 2004
 "Truly (The Wise Buddah Edit)" - 3:46
 "Truly (Infusion Remix)" - 9:49
 "Truly (Brother Brown Remix)" - 9:30
 "Truly (Signum Remix)" - 8:03
 "Truly (The Wise Buddah Mix)" - 7:21
 "Truly (Brother Brown Dub)" - 9:30

 US Vinyl - 2004
 "Truly (Infusion Remix)" - 9:49
 "Truly (Brother Brown Remix)" - 9:30
 "Truly (Signum Remix)" - 8:03
 "Truly (The Wise Buddah Club Mix)" - 7:21

 UK CD-Maxi - 2004
 "Truly (The Wise Buddah Club Mix - Radio Edit)" - 3:41 This version is different from the other Wise Buddah Edit.
 "Truly (Signum Remix)" - 8:03
 "Truly (Infusion Remix)" - 9:49
 "Truly (Brother Brown Remix)" - 9:30
 "Truly (Album Version Edit)" - 3:38

 Europe CD-maxi - 2004
 "Truly (The Wise Buddah Edit)" - 3:46
 "Truly (Infusion Remix)" - 9:49
 "Truly (Signum Remix)" - 8:03
 "Truly (The Wise Buddah Mix)" - 7:21
 "Truly (Brother Brown Remix)" - 9:30

Charts

References

Delerium songs
2003 songs
Songs written by Nerina Pallot
Nettwerk Records singles
Songs written by Bill Leeb
Songs written by Rhys Fulber